John Andrew 'Jack' Tooher (18 November 1846 – 23 May 1941) was a First-class cricketer for New South Wales and a cricket Test match umpire.

Tooher was a right-hand batsman who played one match in 1875/76, scoring 0 not out in his only innings.

He umpired 1 Test match between Australia and England in Sydney on 29 January to 3 February 1892, standing with Tom Flynn.  He witnessed Alick Bannerman scoring only 67 runs in a complete day's play, and a hat-trick to England's Johnny Briggs in a match in which Australia came from over 150 runs behind on the first innings to win by 72 runs.

In a match between Victoria and New South Wales in January 1894, Tooher delayed the start of the last day's play because he believed the pitch was too wet.  When play did start, Victoria collapsed and lost the match.  Their captain, Jack Blackham, blamed Tooher for the defeat, saying that he had delayed the start until the pitch was sticky and favoured the bowlers.  Tooher took exception to the remarks and retired, but later accepted an apology.

See also
Australian Test Cricket Umpires
List of Test umpires

References
 Pollard, Jack, "Australian Cricket: 1803-1893, The Formative Years". Sydney, The Book Company, 1995.

External links
 
 

Australian Test cricket umpires
1846 births
1941 deaths
Sportsmen from New South Wales
Cricketers from Sydney
New South Wales cricketers